John Clinton "Monk" Sherlock (October 26, 1904 – November 26, 1985) was a professional baseball player. He played one season in Major League Baseball for the 1930 Philadelphia Phillies, primarily as a first baseman. He was also the older brother of Vince Sherlock who appeared in nine games for the 1935 Brooklyn Dodgers. Sherlock was born in Buffalo, New York and died there in 1985.

Notes

External links 
 

Major League Baseball first basemen
Philadelphia Phillies players
Quebec Bulldogs (baseball) players
Williamsport Grays players
Wilson Bugs players
Seattle Indians players
Mission Reds players
Hollywood Stars players
Syracuse Chiefs players
Indianapolis Indians players
Baseball players from Buffalo, New York
1904 births
1985 deaths
Burials at Forest Lawn Cemetery (Buffalo)